Winifred Marshall Gales (10 July 1761 – 26 June 1839) was an American novelist and memoirist.  Gales was born in 1761 in Newark-upon-Trent, England, the daughter of John Marshall. She wrote the first novel published by a resident in North Carolina.

Biography
She exhibited literary talent at an early age and in 1787 published her first novel, The History of Lady Emma Melcombe, and Her Family. Aged 23, she married Joseph Gales, Sr., a liberal reform supporter and abolitionist. Because of his views, he eventually fled England for continental Europe, leaving Winifred in charge of the family bookstore and printing press.  With the political climate in England and a warrant for his arrest precluding her husband's return, Winifred Gales sold the Sheffield Register newspaper to its assistant editor, James Montgomery, and joined her husband in Altona near Hamburg, Germany.

In 1795, the Gales family sailed to Philadelphia and four years later settled in Raleigh, North Carolina where Joseph Gales became editor and printer of The Raleigh Register, a newspaper supporting Jeffersonian Republicanism.  In 1804, Gales published Matilda Berkely; or, Family Anecdotes, which is considered the first novel ever published in North Carolina by a resident of that state.  Firm Unitarians and promoters of tolerance, the Gales left Raleigh for Washington, D.C. in 1833 amid growing orthodox trends in North Carolina. She died in Washington in 1833, and is buried in the Congressional Cemetery.

See also
Seaton Gales

References

External links
Gales Family Papers
Matilda Berkely, or Family Anecdotes
Winifred Marshall Gales Biography at bookrags.com

1761 births
1839 deaths
18th-century American novelists
American memoirists
American women novelists
English emigrants to the United States
People from Newark-on-Trent
Writers from Raleigh, North Carolina
19th-century American novelists
Burials at the Congressional Cemetery
American women memoirists
19th-century American women writers
18th-century American women writers
Novelists from North Carolina